Mosley Street was a tram stop in the City Zone (now Zone 1) of Greater Manchester's Metrolink light rail system which closed on 18 May 2013. It was located on Mosley Street in Manchester city centre and was the last unidirectional stop on the Metrolink, with a single platform serving southbound passengers travelling towards Altrincham Interchange, Eccles Interchange,  and  only.

Mosley Street tram stop opened on 27 April 1992, as part of Phase 1 of Metrolink's construction. The only remaining example in the City Zone, it was designed with a varied height platform, partly full-height with ramped lower sections. When a service was worked by two coupled T-68 vehicles, the rear vehicle extended mechanical steps to allow access at the low-platform sections  - a feature absent in the newer M5000 vehicles.

History

Market Street was reconfigured in 1998 to handle trams in both directions and High Street tram stop was closed, leaving  Mosley Street as the only unidirectional stop on the network.

Following the 2009 City Centre Track Upgrade Project, all other Metrolink street-level stops in the City Zone were rebuilt to full platform height. This change was carried out to remove the need for retractable steps, which were proving technically problematic (the new fleet of M5000 trams had been built without retractable steps). The new platforms can also accommodate double-length vehicles.

Mosley Street was the only tram stop in Manchester not upgraded. A review of the stop's future was conducted and found that the stop could cause congestion for trams at the Piccadilly delta junction when additional services are implemented. The report also noted that the tight confines around the stop location meant that rebuilding the platform to the new specifications would impact on pedestrian flows and access to adjacent retail establishments.

With two other Metrolink stops in close proximity (Piccadilly Gardens, and Market Street), the expense of a platform upgrade was not considered to be economically or operationally justifiable. The decision was taken in February 2010 to close the stop.

Mosley Street tram stop closed on 18 May 2013 following the departure at 00:51 of the last tram, on a service to Altrincham.

References

External links

Metrolink city centre map

Disused Manchester Metrolink tram stops
Railway stations in Great Britain opened in 1992
Railway stations in Great Britain closed in 2013